Graeme Bowbrick  (born 1966) is a Canadian lawyer, educator and former politician. Bowbrick is a faculty member in the Criminology Department at Douglas College and sits on the College Board. He served as a New Democratic Member of the Legislative Assembly of British Columbia from 1996 to 2001, representing the riding of New Westminster. He served as Minister of Advanced Education in 2000, and Attorney General in 2000–2001.

Bowbrick received a Bachelor of Arts from Simon Fraser University in 1989, an LL.B. from the University of Victoria in 1992 and was called to the Bar on May 14, 1993. He received an LL.M. from the University of British Columbia in 2013.

Academic career
Bowbrick is an instructor in the Criminology and Legal Studies programs at Douglas College.  He is also an adjunct professor at Simon Fraser University, teaching in the Criminology and Masters in Applied Legal Studies programs.

Electoral history 

|- bgcolor="white"
!align="right" colspan=3|Total Valid Votes
!align="right"|22,475
!align="right"|100.00%
!align="right"|
!align="right"|
|- bgcolor="white"
!align="right" colspan=3|Total Rejected Ballots
!align="right"|113
!align="right"|0.50%
!align="right"|
!align="right"|
|- bgcolor="white"
!align="right" colspan=3|Turnout
!align="right"|22,588
!align="right"|71.07%
!align="right"|
!align="right"|

|- bgcolor="white"
!align="right" colspan=3|Total Valid Votes
!align="right"|22,313
!align="right"|100.00%
!align="right"|
!align="right"|
|- bgcolor="white"
!align="right" colspan=3|Total Rejected Ballots
!align="right"|133
!align="right"|0.59%
!align="right"|
!align="right"|
|- bgcolor="white"
!align="right" colspan=3|Turnout
!align="right"|22,446
!align="right"|70.41%
!align="right"|
!align="right"|

References

20th-century Canadian legislators
21st-century Canadian legislators
British Columbia New Democratic Party MLAs
Living people
Attorneys General of British Columbia
Members of the Executive Council of British Columbia
Simon Fraser University alumni
University of Victoria alumni
University of Victoria Faculty of Law alumni
Peter A. Allard School of Law alumni
1966 births
Canadian King's Counsel